A media proprietor, media mogul or media tycoon refers to an entrepreneur who controls, through personal ownership or via a dominant position in any media-related company or enterprise, media consumed by many individuals. Those with significant control, ownership, and influence of a large company in the mass media may also be called a tycoon, baron, or business magnate. Social media creators and founders can also be considered media proprietors.

History
In the United States, newspaper proprietors first became prominent in the 19th century with the development of mass circulation newspapers. In the 20th century, proprietorship expanded to include ownership of radio and television networks, as well as film studios, publishing houses, and more recently internet and other forms of multimedia companies. Reflecting this, the term "press baron" was replaced by "media baron", and the term "media mogul" (or "Hollywood mogul" when applied to people specifically working in the motion picture industry, having actually spawned a similarly named computer game) was popularized in colloquial English. 

Media proprietors often claim that their publications are editorially independent, but this is questioned.

Social networking services such as Facebook are sometimes considered media companies, due to their influence. Media and technology play a significant role in mass-media production.

Notable media proprietors

 Jay-Z
 Jack Dorsey (Twitter)
 Max Aitken, 1st Baron Beaverbrook (Daily Express)
 Henry Luce
 Sally Aw
 Andrej Babiš
 Zdeněk Bakala
 Jaume Roures (Mediapro)
 David and Frederick Barclay
 Silvio Berlusconi (Mediaset)
 Jeff Bezos (Amazon, The Washington Post)
 Conrad Black (Hollinger Inc.)
 Michael Bloomberg (Bloomberg)
 Lukas Bonnier
 Scooter Braun
 Subhash Chandra
 Gustavo Cisneros
 Victor Civita (Grupo Abril, Veja)
 Sean Combs
 Richard Desmond (Northern & Shell)
 Hans Dichand
 Walt Disney (Disney)
 Aydın Doğan
 Steve Forbes
 Iris Fontbona
 Octávio Frias (Folha de S.Paulo)
 Sheyene Gerardi
 Lew Grade
 Harold Harmsworth, 1st Viscount Rothermere (Associated Newspapers)
 Alfred Harmsworth, 1st Viscount Northcliffe (Associated Newspapers)
 William Randolph Hearst 
 Robert Hersant
 Alfred Hugenberg
 Sir Edward Hulton, 1st Baronet
 Jeffrey Katzenberg (DreamWorks)
 Jimmy Lai
 Jean-Luc and Arnaud Lagardère
 Roberto Marinho (TV Globo, O Globo)
 Robert Maxwell (Daily Mirror)
 Hary Tanoesoedibjo
 Vince McMahon (WWE)
 John de Mol Jr. (Endemol)
 Javier Moll
 Sun Myung Moon (The Washington Times)
 Rupert Murdoch (News Corp)
 Chairul Tanjung
 Samuel Newhouse
 Roberto Noble
 Denis O'Brien
 Tony O'Reilly
 Kerry Packer
 David Portnoy
 Shahrzad Rafati
 Sumner Redstone
 Mir Shakil ur Rehman
 Pat Robertson (CBN)
 Edir Macedo (RecordTV)
 Matsutaro Shoriki
 Haim Saban
 Davíð Oddsson
 Silvio Santos (SBT)
 Manmohan Shetty
 Axel Springer
 A. G. Sulzberger (The New York Times)
 Al-Waleed bin Talal
 David Thomson
 Roy Thomson, 1st Baron Thomson of Fleet
 Ted Turner (CNN)
 Tsuneo Watanabe
 Jan Wejchert
 Oprah Winfrey
 Mark Zuckerberg (Facebook, Meta Platforms)

References

Concentration of media ownership
Mass media occupations